Judgement 2015 was a professional wrestling event promoted by DDT Pro-Wrestling (DDT). It took place on March 29, 2015, in Tokyo, Japan, at the Korakuen Hall. It was the nineteenth event under the Judgement name. The event aired domestically on Fighting TV Samurai.

Storylines
Judgement 2015 featured seven professional wrestling matches that involved different wrestlers from pre-existing scripted feuds and storylines. Wrestlers portrayed villains, heroes, or less distinguishable characters in the scripted events that built tension and culminated in a wrestling match or series of matches.

Event
The dark match was a King of Dark Championship match between Gorgeous Matsuno and Gota Ihashi. Per the rules of the championship, losing the match caused Ihashi to retain the title.

The third match of the main card was a Falls Count Anywhere match celebrating Sanshiro Takagi's 20 year professional wrestling career. Takagi teamed with Jun Kasai from the hardcore promotion Pro-Wrestling Freedoms.

Next Akito faced X = Shiori Asahi from Kaientai Dojo in the "10-minute Fall Count match", a 10-minute Iron man match in which instead of scoring one point for each pinfall, participants scored a point for each count the referee made during pinfalls (one-counts were worth one point, two-counts were worth two points, etc). The time limit expired while Akito and Asahi were tied 17-17, leading to the referee continuing the match in sudden death overtime. Akito scored a final one-count to win the match 18-17.

The Right To Challenge Anytime, Anywhere Contract Battle Royal was a Rumble rules match for a KO-D Openweight Championship match at Max Bump 2015, on April 29. Six envelopes were suspended above the ring, four of which contained a "Right To Challenge Anytime, Anywhere" contract, giving the right to their holder to challenge any champion at any time in the following year. One envelope contained a "Right To Challenge the King of Dark" contract and the last envelope contained a worthless "Right To Perform Anytime, Anywhere" contract. Grabbing a contract resulted in being eliminated from the match.

In the main event, Strong BJ (Daisuke Sekimoto and Yuji Okabayashi) from Big Japan Pro-Wrestling defended the KO-D Tag Team Championship against Danshoku Dino and Super Sasadango Machine.

Results

Right To Challenge Anytime, Anywhere Contract Battle Royal

Footnotes

References

External links
The official DDT Pro-Wrestling website

2015
2015 in professional wrestling
Professional wrestling in Tokyo